The Arched-hill symbol is a symbol on ancient Coinage of India. There are some variations to the number of the hills depicted, or the symbol surmounting the hill, such as a crescent or a star.

It is thought that the three-arched hill symbol was initiated during the Satavahana Empire (500 BCE). Later, in coins from Taxila dated from 220 BCE, the three-arched symbol appears regularly, and from 185 BCE is regularly associated with the animal figures of the elephant and the lion. In contrast, the Nandipada is generally associated with the zebu bull. On coins of the Shunga period, the three-arched hill can appear among a multitude of other symbols, such as the Nandipada, the tree-in-railing, the elephant, or the empty cross.

The symbol is generally considered a representation of a Tridev , Tripura , based on Vedic principles   . It has also been argued that it was the imperial symbol of the Shubhas /Shinghas. The symbol however, appears in many  contexts as seen with the coins of Taxila and the Shungas.

Gallery

See also
 Post-Mauryan coinage of Gandhara

References

Symbols
Coins of India